Valdovecaria unipunctella is a species of snout moth in the genus Valdovecaria. It was described by Pierre Chrétien in 1911. It is found in North Africa, including Algeria and Morocco.

References

Moths described in 1911
Anerastiini